Gia is a most likely English female name, used as short for the Italian name Gianna (English Jane), Giada (English Jade) or Georgia.

People named Gia
 Gia Allemand (1983–2013), American actress and model
 Gia Carangi (1960–1986), American model
 Gia Crovatin (born 1985), American actress and producer
 Gia To, French photographer and journalist in videogames
 Gia Carides (born 1974), Australian actress
 Gia Ciambotti (born 1962), American singer
 Gia Darling (born 1977), transsexual adult film actress
 Gia Farrell (born 1989), American singer
 Gia Giudice, a reality show personality on the reality show Real Housewives of New Jersey
 Gia Johnson (born 1986), British model
 Gia Maione (1941–2013), American singer and widow of singer Louis Prima
 Gia Mantegna (born 1990), American actress and daughter of actor Joe Mantegna
 Gia Milinovich (born 1969), American-British television presenter and writer
 Gia Scala (1934–1972), English-American actress of Italian-Irish descent
 Gia Ventola, American fashion designer
 Gia Gunn, famous drag queen.

Fictional characters named Gia
Gia Campbell, in the soap opera General Hospital
Gia Goodman, a minor character in the television show Veronica Mars
Gia Mahan, a secondary character in the television show Full House
Gia Moran, in the television show Power Rangers Megaforce
Gia the Jaguar, in the film Madagascar 3: Europe's Most Wanted
Gia Bennett, in the TV series Euphoria (American TV series)

Popularity
As a baby name it was the 730th most popular name in the U.S.

References

English feminine given names
Italian feminine given names
Given names